Nariman (Maxmut) is a rural locality (a selo) and the administrative centre of Koktyubinsky Selsoviet, Nogaysky District, Republic of Dagestan, Russia. The population was 1,790 as of 2010. There are 102 streets.

Geography 
Nariman is located 5 km northwest of Terekli-Mekteb (the district's administrative centre) by road. Terekli-Mekteb and Kalininaul are the nearest rural localities.

Nationalities 
Nogais live there.

References 

Rural localities in Nogaysky District, Dagestan